#Twice2 (Hashtag Twice2) is the second Japanese compilation album by South Korean girl group Twice. It consists of both Korean and Japanese versions of "Likey", "Heart Shaker", "What Is Love?", "Dance the Night Away" and "Yes or Yes". It was released by Warner Music Japan on March 6, 2019.

Background and release
In January 2019, JYP Entertainment announced that Twice would release their second Japanese compilation album on March 6, as well as embark on a dome tour in Japan later that month. "Likey (Japanese ver.)" was pre-released on January 10 as a digital single, along with an accompanying music video. "What Is Love? (Japanese ver.)" was pre-released as a digital single on February 7, also with an accompanying music video.

#Twice2 was officially released on March 6 in three versions: Standard Edition, First Press Limited Edition A (CD and photo book) and Limited Edition B (CD and DVD). It was also released as a digital download in EP format, containing only the five Japanese-language songs.

Promotion
On March 8, 2019, Twice performed a medley of "Yes or Yes (Japanese ver.)", "Likey (Japanese ver.)" and "What Is Love? (Japanese ver.)" on Music Station.

Commercial performance
The album debuted at number 1 on the daily ranking of Oricon Albums Chart with 95,825 units sold, breaking Twice's record of the highest first day album sales for K-pop girl groups in Japan. It was also reported that shipments of the album exceeded 250,000 copies. #Twice2 then topped the weekly Oricon Albums Chart with 200,846 units sold. It is the first album by a foreign female artist to sell more than 200,000 albums in the first week since Kara's Super Girl in 2011. On Oricon Digital Album Chart, it debuted at number 2 with 5,192 download count. It also topped the Billboard Japan Hot Albums recorded 211,406 copies sold.

Track listing

Charts

Weekly charts

Year-end charts

Certifications

References

Twice (group) albums
Warner Music Japan compilation albums
2019 compilation albums
Japanese-language compilation albums